was a government ministry of Japan headquartered in Kasumigaseki, Chiyoda, Tokyo.

In 2001 it merged into the Ministry of Land, Infrastructure, Transport and Tourism.

References

External links
 
  
 

 
C
Ministries disestablished in 2001
2001 disestablishments in Japan